The Rio golden-eyed tree frog (Trachycephalus imitatrix) is a species of frog in the family Hylidae found in Argentina and Brazil. Its natural habitats are subtropical or tropical moist lowland forests, subtropical or tropical moist montane forests, and freshwater marshes.
It is threatened by habitat loss.

References

Trachycephalus
Amphibians described in 1926
Taxonomy articles created by Polbot